The Trivandrum Engineering Science and Technology Research Park (TrEST), commonly known as TrEST Research Park is the first technology research science park in Kerala and is founded by the Government of Kerala. It is a concentration of collaborative research in microprocessor design, electric vehicle research, and other emerging technologies and has strong links with College of Engineering, Trivandrum and APJ Abdul Kalam Technological University.

The science park is currently situated about 11 km to the north of Thiruvananthapuram city centre, in the College of Engineering Trivandrum (CET) campus. The park will be moved to a 50 acre campus at Vilappilsala, adjacent to the APJ Abdul Kalam Technological University campus.

References

External links
 Official website

Research institutes in Thiruvananthapuram